Enver Soobzokov (born May 3, 1978) is a Jordanian professional basketball player of Circassian descent. He plays for ASU of the Jordanian basketball league.  He also is a member of the Jordan national basketball team.

Soobzokov competed with the Jordanian team at the FIBA Asia Championship 2007 and FIBA Asia Championship 2009.  In 2009, Soobzokov helped the Jordanian team to a national best third-place finish by averaging 4.1 points per game and playing strong defense off the bench for the team.

References

1978 births
Living people
Asian Games competitors for Jordan
Basketball players at the 2006 Asian Games
Jordanian men's basketball players
Jordanian people of Circassian descent
Small forwards
2010 FIBA World Championship players